Louis Poggi may refer to:

 Louis Pioggi (1889–1969), New York criminal and member of the Five Points Gang
 Louis Poggi (footballer) (born 1984), French footballer